The Golden Ticket Award for Best New Ride is presented by Amusement Today to the best new attraction in the water park industry. The award was presented for best new attraction in both water parks and amusement parks since its inception in 2005 until 2018.

History
The Golden Ticket Awards have been presenting awards since 1998 acknowledging amusement and water parks for their achievement in different categories. The Best New Ride award was introduced in the form of two different awards to acknowledge the best in amusement and water parks. The award has been presented since 2005 and has been featured on the Discovery Channel and the Travel Channel.
In 2019, the amusement park award was split into three categories. The overall award was renamed to Best New Attraction Installation of 2019, with  "industry suppliers and parks hav[ing] direct involvement with nominations". The Best New Family Attraction and Best New Roller Coaster categories were also introduced.

Amusement park ride recipients

Best New Amusement Ride
From 2005 to 2018, the fourteen winners were only produced by twelve different theme parks. The parks to introduce the most winners in this timespan were Cedar Point and Dollywood with two rides each. With five awards, Cedar Fair is the company that produced the most best new rides.

Water park ride recipients
Although the Best New Water Park Ride award has been presented to 16 attractions, only seven different water parks have garnered the award. The park that received the most new water attraction awards is Holiday World & Splashin' Safari with a total of five. The Schlitterbahn company also won five awards but that involved three different properties.

Due to an incident in 2016 in which a ten-year-old boy was decapitated, Verrückt became the first ride that had won an award from Amusement Today for Best New Ride to be removed. Verrückt operated for 2 and a half seasons before closing indefinitely on August 7, 2016.

References

External links
 Current Golden Ticket Awards at Amusement Today's Golden Ticket website

Golden Ticket Awards
 
Awards established in 2005